The Alnwick Playhouse is an arts centre, theatre and cinema in the town of Alnwick in Northumberland, England. It is also the headquarters of the NTC Touring Theatre Company.

The building itself consists of many different parts. There is the main stage (with green room behind it) and an auditorium that sits over 200 people. Underneath the auditorium is a bar area with seating. On the ground floor, there is a foyer, a box office, a workshop, the NTC Touring Company office and a small 'black box theatre' style performance/rehearsal space with some limited seating.

History 
The Playhouse was originally built in 1925 as a 700-seat cinema and occasional music hall. The Playhouse eventually closed in 1979. The NTC Touring Theatre Company bought the building and converted the ground floor. The upper floor was leased out to The Alnwick District Playhouse Trust who re-opened the newly refurbished Alnwick Playhouse in December, 1990. It has remained open since then.

See also
Alnwick

References

External links

Theatres Trust Database: Playhouse

Alnwick
Theatres in Northumberland